Flight is a 2021 Indian thriller film directed by Suraj Joshi and produced by Crazy Boyz Entertainment Production. The film stars Mohit Chadda, Pavan Malhotra, Zakir Hussain, Shibani Bedi and others.

It released on 2 April 2021, in theatres in India. The film was earlier slated for release on 19 March 2021, but the makers postponed the release to 2 April after Akshay Kumar-starrer Sooryavanshi cancelled its release due to resurgence in cases of COVID-19 in India.

Synopsis 
The film follows the journey of Ranveer Malhotra who against all odds has to face deadly obstacles on a plane to survive. After a plane manufactured by Ranveer's company crashes leading to the death of many passengers, he decides to investigate the case. Against the wishes of the other shareholders of the company, he tries to uncover the truth but his plane gets hijacked.

Reviews 
The movie received positive reviews from publications like India.com, Bollywood Life, Republic World, Cinestaan among others. Mohit Chadda is appreciated for his performance and the film is described as an edge-of the seat nail-biting action thriller. Flight is one of the highest rated Bollywood movies of 2021 on IMDb. The film got support from Bollywood celebrities with actors like Amitabh Bachchan, Anupam Kher tweeting about the film. Filmibeat appreciated Mohit Chadda's performance and the impeccable VFX and cinematography.

Cast
 Mohit Chadda as Ranveer Malhotra
 Pavan Malhotra as Balraj Sahni (Ranveer's late father's brother)
 Zakir Hussain as Raman Khanna
 Shibani Bedi as Rukhsana
 Ishita Sharma as Ishita
 Pritam Singh as Capt. Sanjay Sanyal

References

External links
 

2021 films
Indian action thriller films
2021 action thriller films
2020s Hindi-language films